The male first name Ampelius may refer to:

Lucius Ampelius, early 3rd-century Latin author of the Liber Memorialis
Ampelius (bishop of Milan), fl. in the 7th century